Milson Jones is a former award winning and Grey Cup champion fullback in the Canadian Football League.

Born in Jamaica, Jones was a stand-out player at the University of North Dakota. He joined the Winnipeg Blue Bombers in 1982. In 1984, he moved to the Edmonton Eskimos, where in 1987 he won the Grey Cup in a classic game, being named the Dick Suderman Trophy winner. His next stop was the Saskatchewan Roughriders in 1988, where he had his two best seasons, rushing for 730 yards in 1988 and 765 yards in 1990. He also won another Grey Cup, again a classic game in 1989. In 11 seasons he rushed for 4930 yards and caught 359 passes for another 3873 yards.

Both Milson's sons (Devon and Tristan) became Canadian university football stars.

References

1959 births
Winnipeg Blue Bombers players
Saskatchewan Roughriders players
Edmonton Elks players
University of North Dakota alumni
North Dakota Fighting Hawks football players
Living people
Jamaican players of Canadian football
People from Saint Catherine Parish
Jamaican emigrants to Canada
Black Canadian players of Canadian football